Misa Regatta is a boat racing track and park located in the neighborhood of Misa-dong in Hanam City, Gyeonggi Province, in the vicinity of 20 km east of Seoul, South Korea. It was established for the rowing and canoeing competition during the 1986 Asian Games and the 1988 Olympics. The place has a 4.4 million square meters in total, the lake area of which covers 2,212 m in length, 140m in width and depth 3m. The area was originally a small island surrounded by sand which made its scenery as beautiful as if it were waving, so was named "Misa-ri" (sand waving) in Korean.

References

External links
Canoeing and canoodling by the waterfront at the JoongAng Daily

Sports venues in Gyeonggi Province
Sport in Gyeonggi Province
Venues of the 1988 Summer Olympics
Olympic canoeing venues
Olympic rowing venues
Buildings and structures in Hanam
Venues of the 1986 Asian Games